Crematogaster torosa is a species of ant in the family Formicidae.

Subspecies
These four subspecies belong to the species Crematogaster torosa:
 Crematogaster torosa chodati Forel, 1921 i c g
 Crematogaster torosa goeldii Forel, 1903 i c g
 Crematogaster torosa stigmatica Forel, 1911 i c g
 Crematogaster torosa torosa Mayr, 1870 i c g
Data sources: i = ITIS, c = Catalogue of Life, g = GBIF, b = Bugguide.net

References

Further reading

External links

 

torosa
Articles created by Qbugbot
Insects described in 1870